Sustan (also Romanized as Sūstān; also known as Sīstān) is a village in Layl Rural District, in the Central District of Lahijan County, Gilan Province, Iran. At the 2006 census, its population was 4,341, in 1,229 families.

References 

Populated places in Lahijan County